This list of canyons and gorges includes both land and submarine canyons with the land canyons being sorted by continent and then by country.

Africa

South Africa
Blyde River Canyon, Mpumalanga
Kloof, KwaZulu-Natal (The word Kloof means 'gorge' in Afrikaans)
Komati Gorge
Lanner Gorge
Oribi Gorge, KwaZulu-Natal

Other countries
Lesotho - Senqu River Canyon
Lesotho - Maletsunyane River Gorge
Lesotho - Makhaleng River Canyon
Cameroon- Gorges de Kola
Egypt- Arada Canyon
Ethiopia- Blue Nile Gorge
Madagascar- Isalo Canyon
MaliTalari Gorges
Morocco- Todgha Gorge
NamibiaFish River Canyon
Republic of Congo- Gorges of Diosso
TanzaniaOlduvai Gorge
TunisiaMides Canyon

Americas

Argentina 

 Atuel Canyon, Mendoza Province
 Pinturas River Canyon, Santa Cruz Province
 Talampaya River Canyon

Brazil
Guartelá Canyon, Paraná
Itaimbezinho, Aparados da Serra National Park, Rio Grande do Sul
Fortaleza Canyon, Aparados da Serra National Park, Rio Grande do Sul

Canada
Agawa Canyon, Ontario
Barron River (Ontario)
Canyon Sainte-Anne, Quebec
Painted Chasm, British Columbia
Farwell Canyon, British Columbia
Fraser Canyon, British Columbia
Grand Canyon of the Stikine, British Columbia
Horseshoe Canyon, Alberta
Niagara Gorge, Ontario
Ouimet Canyon, Ontario

Chile
Cajón del Maipo, Santiago Metropolitan Region

Colombia
Chicamocha Canyon, Santander
Saturban canyon, Santander

Mexico
Copper Canyon, Chihuahua
Huasteca Canyon, Monterrey
Sumidero Canyon, Chiapas

Peru
Colca Canyon, Arequipa
Cotahuasi Canyon, Arequipa

United States

Antelope Canyon, Arizona
Ausable Chasm, New York
Bad Rock Canyon, Montana
Bighorn Canyon, Montana and Wyoming
Big South Fork of the Cumberland River gorge, Kentucky and Tennessee
Black Canyon of the Gunnison, Colorado
Bluejohn Canyon, Utahsite of Aron Ralston's accident
Breaks Canyon, Kentucky and Virginia
Canyon de Chelly, Arizona
Canyonlands National Park, canyons of the Colorado River and its main tributary the Green River, Utah
Canyons of the Escalante, Grand Staircase–Escalante National Monument, Utah
Cataract Canyon, Utah
Chaco Canyon, New Mexico
Cloudland Canyon, Georgia
Columbia River Gorge, Washington and Oregon
Desolation Canyon, Utah
Dismals Canyon, Alabama
Echo Canyon, Nevada
Flaming Gorge, Utah and Wyoming
Flume Gorge, New Hampshire
Fremont River Canyon, Utah
Gates of Lodore, Colorado
Genesee River Gorge, New York
Glen Canyon, Utah and Arizona
Glenwood Canyon, Colorado
Grand Canyon, Grand Canyon National Park, Arizona
Grand Canyon of the Tuolumne, Yosemite National Park, California
Grand Canyon of the Yellowstone, Yellowstone National Park, Wyoming
Grand Coulee, Washington
Gulf Hagas, Maine
Hells Canyon, Idaho, Oregon and Washington
Horseshoe Canyon, Utah
James River Gorge, Virginia
Kings Canyon, California
Kolob Canyons, Zion National Park, Utah
Lehigh River Gorge, Pennsylvania
Linville Gorge, North Carolina
Little River Canyon, Alabama
Logan Canyon, Utah
Marble Canyon, Arizona
Mississippi Gorge, Minnesota
Moses Coulee, Washington
McKittrick Canyon, Guadalupe Mountains National Park, Texas
New River Gorge, West Virginia
Niagara Gorge, New York
Nine Mile Canyon, Utah
Palo Duro Canyon, Texas
Paria River Canyon, southern Utah into northern Arizona
Pine Creek Gorge, Pennsylvania
Provo Canyon, Utah
Quartermaster Canyon, Grand Canyon National Park, Arizona
Quechee Gorge, Vermont
Red River Gorge, Kentucky
Rio Grande Gorge, New Mexico
Ripogenus Gorge, Maine
Royal Gorge, Colorado
Ruby Canyon, Colorado and Utah
Sabino Canyon, Arizona
Saint Christopher's Canyon, Aibonito and Barranquitas, Puerto Rico
Salt River Canyon, Arizona
San Rafael River Gorge, Utah
Santa Elena Canyon, Big Bend National Park, Texas (also in Big Bend N.P.: Boquillas and Mariscal Canyons)
Tallulah Gorge, Georgia
Titus Canyon, Death Valley, California (also in Death Valley: Golden, Mosaic and Natural Bridge Canyons)
Virgin River Gorge, Arizona and Utah
Waimea Canyon, Hawaii
Walnut Canyon, Arizona
Westwater Canyon, Utah
Wind River Canyon, Wyoming
Zion Canyon, Utah
Providence Canyon, Georgia

Other countries
BoliviaGrand Canyon of Torotoro, Torotoro, Potosi Department
NicaraguaSomoto Canyon, Somoto, Madriz

Asia

China
Three Gorges, Chongqing
Tiger Leaping Gorge, Yunnan
Yarlung Zangbo Grand Canyon, Tibet Autonomous Region

Nepal
Chovar Gorge, Kathmandu
Kali Gandaki Gorge, Gandaki

India
Gandikota, Kadapa District, Andhra Pradesh
Garadia Mahadev, Kota district, Rajasthan
Idukki, Western Ghats, Kerala
Raneh Falls, Chatarpur district, Madhya Pradesh
Satkosia Tiger Reserve, Angul district, Odisha
Dayangmukh, Dima Hasao, Assam
Assi Ganga, Uttarkashi, Uttarakhand 
Shatadru, Kufri, Himachal Pradesh

Philippines
Bued Gorge, Benguet
Montalban Gorge, Central Luzon

Other countries
IndonesiaCukang Taneuh, Pangandaran, Brown Canyon in Semarang
JordanSiq, Petra
KazakhstanSharyn Canyon
Kyrgyz RepublicAla Archa gorge of Ala Archa National Park
OmanWadi Ghul
PakistanIndus River Gorge through the Himalaya; Soan River gorge
TaiwanTaroko Gorge of Taroko National Park

Europe

Albania
Osum Gorge
Këlcyrë Gorge

Austria
Leutasch Gorge
Liechtensteinklamm

England
Avon Gorge, Bristol
Cheddar Gorge, Somerset
Ebbor Gorge, Somerset
Gordale Scar, North Yorkshire
Ironbridge Gorge, Shropshire

France
Ardèche Gorges, Auvergne-Rhône-Alpes
Daluis Gorge, Provence-Alpes-Côte d'Azur
Gorges du Tarn, Occitanie
Verdon Gorge, Provence-Alpes-Côte d'Azur

Georgia
Aragvi River Gorge
Pankisi Gorge
Okaze canyon
Martvili canyon

Greece
Agia Eirini Gorge, Crete
Ha Gorge, Crete
Imbros Gorge, Crete
Kotsifos Gorge, Crete
Kourtaliotiko Gorge, Crete
Richtis Gorge, Crete
Sarakina Gorge, Crete
Samaria Gorge, Crete
Vikos Gorge, Vikos–Aoös National Park

Italy
Bletterbach, South Tyrol
Gorropu, Sardinia

Montenegro
Morača Canyon
Tara River Canyon
Piva Canyon

Norway
Allmannajuvet Canyon, Rogaland
Jutulhogget Canyon, Hedmark
Jutulhogget Canyon, Oppland
Mågålaupet Gorge, Sør-Trøndelag
Sautso Canyon, Finnmark

Russia

 Sulak Canyon, Dagestan

Switzerland
Aare Gorge, Kanton Bern
Viamala, Graubünden

Turkey

Boğazpınar Canyon, Mersin Province
Harmanköy Canyon, Bilecik
Ulubey Canyon, Uşak
Valla Canyon, Küre, Kastamonu

Other countries
BulgariaTrigrad Gorge
GreenlandGreenland's Grand Canyon
IcelandFjaðrárgljúfur Canyon
MacedoniaMatka Canyon
RomaniaBicaz Gorge
ScotlandCorrieshalloch Gorge
SerbiaRugova Canyon
UkraineDniester Canyon
SpainCongost de Mont-Rebei

Oceania

Australia
Barfold Gorge, Victoria
Barron Gorge, Queensland
Bouldercombe Gorge, Queensland
Cambanoora Gorge, Queensland
Capertee Valley, New South Wales
Carnarvon Gorge, Queensland
Cataract Gorge, Tasmania
Dimond Gorge, Western Australia
Galston Gorge, New South Wales
Geikie Gorge National Park, Western Australia
Jamison Valley, New South Wales
Karijini National Park, Western Australiacontains gorges named Dales, Hamersley, Hancock, Joffre, Kalamina, Knox, Munjina, Range, Red, Weano, Wittenoom and Yampire; blue asbestos exists in the latter two gorges
Katherine Gorge, Northern Territory
Kings Canyon, Northern Territory
Lerderderg Gorge, Victoria
Little River Gorge, Victoria
Loch Ard Gorge, Victoria
Mossman Gorge, Queensland
Murchison River Gorge, Western Australia
Nepean Gorge, New South Wales
North and South Gorges of North Stradbroke Island, Queensland
Palm Valley, Northern Territory
Porcupine Gorge, Queensland
Purnululu National Park, Western AustraliaCathedral and Piccaninny Gorges, and Echidna Chasm
Ravine des Casoars, South Australia
Sturt Gorge, South Australia
West MacDonnell National Park, Northern Territory
Windjana Gorge, Western Australia

New Zealand
Ashley Gorge, Canterbury region
Buller Gorge, Buller
Cromwell Gorge, Central Otago
Karangahake Gorge, Coromandel Peninsula
Karapoti Gorge, Wellington Region
Kawarau Gorge, Central Otago
Manawatu Gorge, Manawatu
Ngauranga Gorge, Wellington City
Poolburn Gorge, Central Otago
Rakaia Gorge, Canterbury Region
Skippers Canyon, Central Otago
Taieri Gorge, South Otago
Trotters Gorge, North Otago
Waimakariri Gorge, Canterbury Region
Weka Pass, Canterbury Region
Windy Canyon, Great Barrier Island

Submarine canyons
A submarine canyon is a steep-sided valley with nearly vertical walls cut into the seabed of the continental margin, sometimes extending well onto the continental shelf.

Atlantic Ocean
Amazon Canyon, extending from the Amazon River off the coast of Brazil
Avilés Canyon, off the coast of Asturias, Spain
Baltimore Canyon, off the coast of Maryland
Congo Canyon, extending from the Congo River off the coast of the Democratic Republic of the Congo
Great Bahama Canyon, between the islands of The Bahamas
Hatteras Canyon, off the coast of North Carolina
Hudson Canyon, extending from the Hudson River off the coast of New York City between the Long Island and the New Jersey coasts of the United States
Mona Canyon, off the coast of western Puerto Rico
Nazaré Canyon, off the coast of Portugal
Whittard Canyon, off the southwest coast of Ireland
Wilmington Canyon, off the coast of Delaware, the United States

Indian Ocean
Ganges Canyon, extending from the Ganges off the coast of India
Indus Canyon, extending from the Indus River off the coast of Pakistan
Perth Canyon, extending from the Swan River off the coast of Fremantle. Western Australia

Pacific Ocean
Bering Canyon, in the Bering Sea near the Aleutian Islands, Alaska, the United States
Kaikoura Canyon, off the coast of the Kaikoura Peninsula, New Zealand
La Jolla Canyon, off the coast of La Jolla, California
Monterey Canyon, off the coast of central California, the United States
Pribilof Canyon, in the Bering Sea, southeast of the Pribilof Islands, Alaska
Scripps Canyon, off the coast of La Jolla, southern California
Zhemchug Canyon, in the central Bering Sea between the Aleutian Islands of Alaska and the Kamchatka Peninsula of Russia; the largest submarine canyon in the world based on drainage area

Black Sea
Danube Canyon, off the coast of Romania

References

Lists of landforms